Aliaksei Ivanavich Aleksin (Aleksey Ivanovich Oleksin) is a Belarusian businessman (petrochemical wholesaler and tobacco tycoon), who is closely associated with Belarusian president Alexander Lukashenko. In summer 2021, the European Union, USA, Canada and Switzerland imposed sanctions on Aleksin as a "wallet" of Lukashenko.

Early life and education
The early life of Aleksin is almost unknown. He graduated from the Lomonosov aerial technical military academy as a helicopter technician, then he graduated from Novosibirsk State Academy of Water Transport.

Career
Aleksin worked in the Belvneshtorginvest company, which is owned by the Presidential administration of Belarus. His first steps in business are unknown. It was speculated that in Belvneshtorginvest Aleksin oversaw petrochemicals exports carried by Yury Chyzh. After Chyzh was included in EU's travel ban list, Aleksin became the nominal owner of his petrochemical wholesale companies (Energo Oil, Belneftegaz, Neonafta).

After Yury Chyzh fell into disgrace, Aleksin was reported to become an associate of senator and businessman Alexander Shakutin.

Assets and controversies
In 2019, Ezhednevnik magazine put Aleksin on 4th place in its top-200 of Belarusian wealthy and influential businessmen. His main assets are  Energo Oil and  Belneftegaz. As of 2015, he owned 60% of these companies directly, and 40% was owned by his wife Inna. In 2021, Aleksin has transferred his share to his sons, junior Vitaly and senior Dzmitry.

In 2015, Aleksin bought 98.97% of Cyprus-based parent company of Belarusian bank MTB (MTBank) from two American and Belarusian investment companies. In 2021, Aleksin sold MTBank's parent company to Dubai-based Stoneva Limited allegedly owned by Lebanese-born Romeo Abdo, but European banks suspected this deal to be a fictitious sale and asked the new owner to clarify it.

In 2020, it was speculated that Aleksin has left petrochemicals wholesale business and set focus on tobacco market.

Accodring to Euroradio, Aleksin's family owned  nearly quarter of Synesis Group, an IT company which is under EU sanctions because of close collaboration with Lukashenko's regime.

 Logistics
 Aleksin owned nearly one third of Bremino Group (with Mikalai Varabei and Aliaksandr Zaitsau), which operated several logistics complexes and a special economic zone in Orsha district, created by Lukashenko's decree. Belarusian economist Jaroslav Romanchuk called Bremino projects a business of elites, establishment and siloviki. Romanchuk also suggested that these businessmen will turn into business oligarchs.

 Tobacco

In 2017—2018, Aleksin's Energo Oil company entered Belarusian tobacco market with help of Lukashenko (later Aleksin created Inter-Tobacco company to manage these projects). He got a special permission of Lukashenko to import cigarettes, while previously only one state-owned company had such permission. Later his companies became the exclusive wholesale and retail operators of the state-owned Grodno tobacco factory; they also got a special permission to import tobacco blends to make cigarettes. Aleksin also started to build new tobacco factory in Minsk.

Mass installation of new cigarettes stands "Tabakerka" (Tobacco box) by Aleksin's companies became a major public controversy. In different Belarusian cities people signed a number of petitions to remove these stands or at least install them far from hospitals, schools and other public facilities. The association of entrepreneurs "Perspective" called on authorities to treat small businesses equally as Aleksin's company: they claimed that local authorities in Minsk previously removed private stands from streets, while Aleksin did not face a similar problem.

In 2020, Russian journalist Tina Kandelaki called to stop cigarettes smuggling to Russia, claiming Aleksin to be one of the main figures of the "Belarusian tobacco mafia".

On 16 February 2021, Alexander Lukashenko granted monopoly on imports of IQOS (heated tobacco product) to Aleksin's Energo Oil.

In 2021 Foreign Policy magazine claimed that Aleksin is one of the main alleged organizers of cigarette smuggling to the European Union.

 Other assets
In 2014, Aleksin bought a meat processing plant in Maladzyechna from Yury Chyzh.

Aleksin's ODO Belneftegaz owns 74.95% of IT-company OOO Synesis Stigma, which was reported to be affiliated with Synesis Group. On 17 December 2020, the Council of the European Union imposed sanctions on Synesis Group.

Aleksin and his family also have some assets in Latvia (Latgales Alus D brewery, and Mamas D company).

 Suisse Secrets
Aleksin was mentioned in the Suisse Secrets data leak in February 2022. According to the investigation made by OCCRP and journalists, Aleksin had a large corporate bank account (CHF 36 million) in the Swiss-based Credit Suisse.
a 40% share in parent companies Energo Oil and Belneftegaz.

In 2012, his son Dmitry became an owner of 40% of at least 2 former companies of Chyzh in Latvia (Mamas D and Latgales Alus D).

References

Living people
21st-century businesspeople
Belarusian businesspeople
Year of birth missing (living people)
Belarusian individuals subject to the U.S. Department of the Treasury sanctions

Siberian State University of Water Transport alumni